Jean Henry Céant (born 27 September 1956) is a Haitian politician who was the twenty-first Prime Minister of Haiti. He was sanctioned by the Canadian Government for his involvement in human rights violations and supporting criminal gangs on 17 November 2022.

Prime Minister

Céant was chosen by President Jovenel Moïse to become Prime Minister of Haiti in August 2018. He was chosen to succeed Jack Guy Lafontant, who had resigned due to an economic crisis. Céant is a  notary by profession and was a presidential candidate in 2016. Ceant also leads a political organization called Renmen Ayiti.

On 18 March 2019, Céant's government was dissolved after a 93–6 vote of censuring the government and enacting a motion of no confidence.

Canadian Government Sanctions Against Céant 
On 17 November 2022, the Government of Canada imposed joint sanctions against Céant, former President Michel Martelly and former Prime Minister Laurent Lamothe. The sanctions against Céant was a response to his allegedly involvement in "gross and systematic human rights violations in Haiti." Specifically Céant is accused of supporting violent armed gangs in Haiti that terrorize the population.

A press release by the office of Canadian Prime Minister Justin Trudeau mentioned that Céant is "suspected of protecting and enabling the illegal activities of armed criminal gangs.

References

1956 births
Living people
Prime Ministers of Haiti
21st-century Haitian politicians
People from Port-au-Prince